State Trunk Highway 59 (often called Highway 59, STH-59 or WIS 59) is a state highway that runs east–west in the southeastern part of the U.S. state of Wisconsin from Milwaukee to Monroe.

Route description
The highway starts at WIS 11 in Monroe and tracks northeasterly. It then passes through Albany and then runs concurrently with WIS 104 for  near Magnolia Bluff Park. It then heads east and runs concurrently with WIS 213 for  until reaching US Highway 14 (US 14) in Evansville, where WIS 213 terminates. WIS 59 remains concurrent with US 14 until reaching Union then heads east through Cooksville and Edgerton, then junctions with Interstate 39/Interstate 90 (I-90/I-90) and then crossing the Rock River near Newville. It then heads southeasterly, passing through Milton and then going east and northeast to Whitewater. It then passes through Palmyra, Eagle, and North Prairie before looping south of Waukesha. The eastern and southern portion of the bypass highway around Waukesha (US 18 and WIS 59/WIS 164) is dedicated as the Les Paul Parkway in honor of Les Paul. WIS 59 runs parallel to I-94 entering Milwaukee County, routed along National Avenue and Greenfield Avenue, then terminates at WIS 32 south of downtown Milwaukee.

Major intersections

See also

References

External links

059
Transportation in Green County, Wisconsin
Transportation in Rock County, Wisconsin
Transportation in Walworth County, Wisconsin
Transportation in Jefferson County, Wisconsin
Transportation in Waukesha County, Wisconsin
Transportation in Milwaukee County, Wisconsin